OpenCorporates is a website that shares data on corporations under the copyleft Open Database License. The company was launched on 20 December 2010, by Chris Taggart and Rob McKinnon.

Recognition 

In 2011, the site won third place in the Open Data Challenge. Vice President of the European Commission Neelie Kroes said the site "is the kind of resource the (Digital) Single Market needs and it is encouraging to see that it is being built." The project was represented on the European Union's Core Vocabularies Working Group's Core Business Task Force.

In early 2012, the project was appointed to the Financial Stability Board's advisory panel on a Legal Entity Identification for Financial Contracts.

In July 2015, OpenCorporates was a finalist in both the Business and Publisher categories at the Open Data Institute Awards. It was announced as the winner of the Open Data Business Award due to work with promoting data transparency in the corporate sector.

This site is posting data scraped from government sites without any permission from companies. Multiple people have requested to have data removed but this site refuses to remove private personal data from this site.

Usage 
The service has been used to study public procurement data, online hiring market, to visualize and analyze company data to analyze tax havens, illicit activities of companies.

See also 

 List of company registers
 Corporate Registers Forum
 European business register

References

External links 

Internet properties established in 2011
Online databases
Open data
Public records